Astartea decemcostata, commonly Barrens astartea, is a shrub endemic to Western Australia.

The shrub is found in a small area along the south coast in the Goldfields-Esperance region of Western Australia.

References

Eudicots of Western Australia
decemcostata
Endemic flora of Western Australia
Plants described in 2013
Taxa named by Barbara Lynette Rye